Sardar Shahab-ud-Din Khan Seehar is a Pakistani politician and agriculturist from District Layyah, South Punjab. Sardar Shahab-ud-Din was born on May 1, 1968. He graduated in 2005 from University of Quetta. He served as Member, Provincial Assembly of the Punjab during 2013-18 and functioned as Chairman, Standing Committee on Special Education. He was elected as Member Punjab Assembly for the second consecutive term in General Elections 2018 and functioned as Parliamentary Secretary for Communication & Works. Sardar Shahab-ud-Din Khan Seehar (PTI) is currently Livestock Minister Punjab.  

He also remained Member, District Council Layyah during 1998-99; and as District Nazim, Layyah during 2001-05. His father Sardar Behram Khan Seehar was MNA during 1977; and functioned as Chairman, Banking Tribunal during 1994-95. His uncle, Sardar Muhammad Jahangir Khan was Member of National Assembly during 1985-88 and 1993-96; and his cousin, Sardar Bahadar Khan served as Member, National Assembly during 2002-07 and 2008-13 and also functioned as Federal Minister for Defence Production; and his another cousin Sardar Sajjad Ahmad Khan remained Tehsil Nazim Karor during 2005-09.

Early life and education
He was born on 1 May 1968 in Layyah District.

He has completed graduation.

Political career

He was elected to the Provincial Assembly of the Punjab as a candidate of Pakistan Peoples Party (PPP) from Constituency PP-263 (Layyah-II) in 2013 Pakistani general election.

In April 2018, he left PPP and joined Pakistan Tehreek-e-Insaf (PTI).

He was re-elected to Provincial Assembly of the Punjab as a candidate of PTI from Constituency PP-281 (Layyah-II) in 2018 Pakistani general election.

References

Living people
Punjab MPAs 2013–2018
1968 births
Pakistan People's Party MPAs (Punjab)
Pakistan Tehreek-e-Insaf MPAs (Punjab)
Punjab MPAs 2018–2023